Dig Deep may refer to:
Dig Deep (album), by After the Burial, 2016
 "Dig Deep" (song), from the American TV series Smash, 2012

See also
Dig Deeper (disambiguation)